Yamhill County is one of the 36 counties in the U.S. state of Oregon. As of the 2020 census, the population was 107,722. The county seat is McMinnville. Yamhill County was named after the Yamhelas, members of the Kalapuya Tribe.
 
Yamhill County is part of the Portland-Vancouver-Hillsboro, OR-WA Metropolitan Statistical Area. It is in the Willamette Valley.

History
The earliest known inhabitants of the area were the Yamhill (Yamhelas Indian Tribe, part of the Kalapooian family) Indians, who have inhabited the area for over 8,000 years. They are one of the tribes incorporated into the Confederated Tribes of the Grand Ronde. In 1857 they were forced to migrate to the Grand Ronde Indian Reservation created in Oregon's Coastal Range two years earlier.

The earliest non-native settlers were employees of the various fur companies operating in Oregon Country, who started settling there around 1814.  But it was the establishment of the Oregon Trail that led to significant migration to the area.

Yamhill District (later county) was created on July 5, 1843, five years before the Oregon Territory was established. It was one of the original four districts created by Oregon's first Provisional Legislature, along with Twality (later Washington), Clackamas, and Champooick (later Marion) counties.

Lafayette, the principal trading center of the western Willamette Valley in early Oregon history, was made the county seat in 1847. The county government was later (1889) moved to McMinnville where it remains today.

The Mount Hebo Air Force Station was a Cold War air defense installation from 1956 to 1980. The large radomes protecting the radars from adverse weather effects could be seen silhouetted against the sky from many parts of Yamhill County.

Lock and dam on the Yamhill River

In 1900 the Yamhill River lock and dam was completed about  downriver from Lafayette, Oregon.  The lock was decommissioned in 1954.  The dam was demolished in 1963 to allow better passage for salmon on the river.  The site of the lock and dam is now a county park.

Geography

It is the fifth-smallest county in Oregon by area.

The tallest mountain in the county is Trask Mountain in the northwest corner of the county.

Adjacent counties
 Washington County (north)
 Clackamas County (east)
 Marion County (southeast)
 Polk County (south)
 Tillamook County (west)

National protected areas
Siuslaw National Forest (part)
Tualatin River National Wildlife Refuge (part)

Demographics

2000 census
As of the census of 2000, there were 84,992 people, 28,732 households, and 21,376 families living in the county.  The population density was 119 people per square mile (46/km2).  There were 30,270 housing units at an average density of 42 per square mile (16/km2).  The racial makeup of the county is 88.98% White, 1.47% Native American, 1.07% Asian, 0.85% Black or African American, 0.12% Pacific Islander, 5.08% from other races, and 2.42% from two or more races. 10.61% of the population were Hispanic or Latino of any race. 19.6% were of German, 11.4% English, 9.5% American and 8.4% Irish ancestry.

There were 28,732 households, out of which 37.40% had children under the age of 18 living with them, 60.00% were married couples living together, 9.90% had a female householder with no husband present, and 25.60% were non-families. 19.70% of all households were made up of individuals, and 8.40% had someone living alone who was 65 years of age or older.  The average household size was 2.78 and the average family size was 3.17.

In the county, the population was spread out, with 26.90% under the age of 18, 11.40% from 18 to 24, 28.50% from 25 to 44, 21.40% from 45 to 64, and 11.70% who were 65 years of age or older.  The median age was 34 years. For every 100 females, there were 102.20 males.  For every 100 females age 18 and over, there were 101.30 males.

The median income for a household in the county is $44,111, and the median income for a family was $50,336. Males had a median income of $35,686 versus $25,254 for females. The per capita income for the county was $18,951. About 6.00% of families and 9.20% of the population were below the poverty line, including 10.10% of those under age 18 and 7.50% of those age 65 or over.

2010 census
As of the 2010 census, there were 99,193 people, 34,726 households, and 25,020 families living in the county. The racial makeup of the county was 85.4% white, 1.5% Asian, 1.5% American Indian, 0.9% black or African American, 0.2% Pacific islander, 7.2% from other races, and 3.3% from two or more races. Those of Hispanic or Latino origin made up 14.7% of the population. In terms of ancestry, 23.6% were German, 13.7% were English, 12.2% were Irish, and 5.0% were American.

Of the 34,726 households, 35.8% had children under the age of 18 living with them, 56.0% were married couples living together, 11.1% had a female householder with no husband present, 28.0% were non-families, and 21.7% of all households were made up of individuals. The average household size was 2.70 and the average family size was 3.12. The median age was 36.8 years.

The median income for a household in the county was $52,485 and the median income for a family was $61,524. Males had a median income of $44,946 versus $33,717 for females. The per capita income for the county was $24,017. About 9.0% of families and 12.7% of the population were below the poverty line, including 16.8% of those under age 18 and 7.7% of those age 65 or over.

Politics
In the United States House of Representatives, Yamhill County lies in Oregon's 1st congressional district, which also covers Washington County, Clatsop County, Columbia County and a small portion of Multnomah County, and is represented by Democrat Suzanne Bonamici. In the Oregon State Senate, most of Yamhill County is in the 12th Senate District represented by former Republican, now Independent, Brian Boquist, whilst the western "panhandle" is in the 5th Senate District represented by Republican Dick Anderson and Newberg, part of the 13th District, is represented by Republican Kim Thatcher and represented in the Oregon House (District 25) by Bill Post. Within the Oregon House of Representatives, Yamhill County lies chiefly within the 24th District represented by Republican Ron Noble, although the western "panhandle" of the county lies within the 10th District represented by Democrat David Gomberg.

Although located west of the Cascades, Yamhill has remained a Republican-leaning county in Presidential elections at the same time as other Western Oregon counties have become solidly to powerfully Democratic. No Democratic presidential candidate has won Yamhill County since Lyndon Johnson's 1964 landslide, and the only other Democrats to carry the county since Oregon's statehood have been Franklin Roosevelt in 1940, 1936 and 1932, along with Woodrow Wilson in 1912 when the Republican vote was divided. However, the Republican edge has narrowed somewhat in recent years; since 1992, the GOP has only managed to win a majority four times.

Economy

In 2019 the Oregon International Air Show switched to the McMinnville Municipal Airport. The Air Show promotes aviation while honoring the military and veterans. In addition to the economic surge provided by the Air Show, the Oregon International Air Show involves the community and provides grants for McMinnville. Since 1988 more than $3 million has donated back throughout McMinnville (Yamhill County), Hillsboro (Washington County), and throughout Oregon. Express Employment Professionals, Stoller Family Estates, and Xenium are the lead sponsors for the upcoming 2020 Air Show.

The major industries of the county are agriculture, forest products, manufacturing, and education.  
Yamhill County's economy is supported largely by its many unionized facilities such as Cascade Steel in McMinnville and Decommissioned White Birch Paper now owned by WestRock in Newberg. It boasts a thriving wine industry and was the home of Evergreen Aviation.

Yamhill County ranks seventh out of Oregon's thirty-six counties in annual market value of its agricultural production. One-third of the county is covered with commercial timber, and the economic mainstay of the western part of the county is logging and timber products.

Yamhill County is a significant focus of Oregon's wine industry, having the largest area of any Oregon county planted in vineyards. Six of the state's American Viticultural Areas are wholly or partly in the county: Chehalem Mountains AVA, Dundee Hills AVA, Eola-Amity Hills AVA, McMinnville AVA, Ribbon Ridge AVA, and Yamhill-Carlton District AVA. Over 80 wineries and 200 vineyards represent the largest concentration of wine growers and producers in any county in the state.  Vineyards often specialize in Pinot noir, but other varieties grown include Pinot gris, Pinot blanc, Chardonnay, Riesling, and Gewürztraminer.

Education
Yamhill County Institutions of Higher Education (IHEs) include Linfield University and Chemeketa Community College McMinnville Campus, along with George Fox University and Portland Community College in Newberg. For private secondary education the county is served by The Delphian School in Sheridan.

Communities

Cities

Amity
Carlton
Dayton
Dundee
Lafayette
McMinnville (county seat)
Newberg
Sheridan
Willamina
Yamhill

Census-designated places
Fort Hill
Grand Ronde

Unincorporated communities

Bellevue
Cove Orchard
Eola Crest
Eola Village
Gopher
Grand Ronde Agency
Hopewell
Lunnville
Midway
Riverside
Saint Joseph
Shipley
Springbrook
Sunnycrest
Unionvale
Wheatland
Whiteson

See also

National Register of Historic Places listings in Yamhill County, Oregon
Yamhill County Courthouse

References

Further reading
 H.O. Lang (ed.), History of the Willamette Valley: Being a Description of the Valley and its Resources, with an Account of its Discovery and Settlement by White Men, and its Subsequent History; Together with Personal Reminiscences of its Early Pioneers. Portland: Himes and Lang, 1885.
 Portrait and Biographical Record of the Willamette Valley, Oregon, Containing Original Sketches of Many Well Known Citizens of the Past and Present. Chicago: Chapman Publishing Co., 1903.

External links

Yamhill County (official website)
County history from the Oregon State Archives
Yamhill County Wineries Association
Yamhill Basin Council
Historical Map of Yamhill County, Oregon* Library of Congress  Map Date: 1879 (hires)  

 
1843 establishments in Oregon Country
Populated places established in 1843
Oregon placenames of Native American origin
Portland metropolitan area